The Central Bank of Bolivia is the central bank of Bolivia, responsible for monetary policy and the issuance of banknotes.

History

The bank was established by Law 632, passed on July 20, 1928. On April 20, 1929, its name was changed to Banco Central de Bolivia, and on July 1, 1929, the bank officially began operations.

Presidents 
Roger Edwin Rojas Ulo, 2020 -
Agustín Saavedra Weise, 2020
Guillermo Aponte, 2019-2020

Pablo Ramos Sánchez, 2017 - 2019
Marcelo Zabalaga Estrada, 2010 - 2016
Gabriel Loza Tellería, 2008 - 2010
Raúl Garrón Claure, 2006 - 2008
Juan Antonio Morales, 1996 - 2006
Fernando Candia Castillo, 1993 - 1995
Armando Méndez Morales, 1992 - 1993
Raúl Boada Rodríguez, 1989 - 1992
Jacques Trigo Loubiere, 1988 - 1989
Javier Nogales Iturri, 1986 - 1988
René Gómez García, 1985 - 1986
Tamara Sánchez Peña, 1985 - 1985
Reynaldo Cardozo Arellano, 1984 - 1985
Marcelo Zalles Barriga, 1984 - 1984
Herbert Müller Costas, 1983 - 1984   
Luis Viscarra Cruz, 1982 - 1983
Gonzalo Ruiz Ballivián, 1982 - 1982
Guido Salinas, 1981 - 1981
Marcelo Montero Nuñez del Prado, 1980 - 1981
Enrique García Ayaviri, 1979 - 1979
Miguel Fabbri Cohn, 1978 - 1979
José Justiniano Aguilera, 1977 - 1978
Luis Bedregal Rodo, 1972 - 1972   
Manuel Mercado Montero, 1971 - 1972
Arturo Nuñez del Prado, 1971 - 1971
Wenceslao Alba Quiroz, 1970 - 1971
Oscar Vega López, 1969 - 1970
Jorge Jordán Ferrufino, 1967 - 1969
Ivan Anaya Oblitas, 1966 - 1967
Luis Arce Pacheco, 1966 - 1966
Alberto Ibañez Gonzales, 1965 - 1966
Santiago Sologuren Sologuren, 1964 - 1965
Raúl Lema Pelaez, 1963 - 1965
Humberto Fossati Rocha, 1961 - 1963   
Eufronio Hinojosa Guzmán, 1960 - 1961
Luis Peñaloza Cordero, 1957 - 1960   
Franklin Antezana Paz, 1954 - 1957   
Armando Pinell Centellas, 1952 - 1954 	
Humberto Cuenca de la Riva, 1951 - 1952   
Alcides Molina, 1950 - 1951
José María Gutiérrez, 1949 - 1950
Alfredo Alexander Jordán, 1946 - 1949
Alberto Mendieta Alvarez, 1946 - 1946   
Arturo Taborga Ramos, 1943 - 1944   
Gabriel Gosálvez, 1940 - 1941
Armando Pacheco Iturralde, 1939 - 1940   
Carlos Hanhart Siemon, 1939 - 1939
Manuel Carrasco Jiménez, 1938 - 1939
Casto Rojas Bautista, 1937 - 1938
Victor Muñoz Reyes, 1936 - 1937
Luis Calvo Calvimontes, 1935 - 1936  
Ismael Montes, 1931-1933
Juan Perou Cusicanqui, 1931   
Daniel Sánchez Bustamante, 1928-1930

Source:

See also

 Ministry of Economy and Public Finance (Bolivia)
 Bolivian boliviano
 Economy of Bolivia

References

External links
  Banco Central de Bolivia official site

Bolivia
1928 establishments in Bolivia
Banks established in 1928
Banks of Bolivia